Velencei Kék Cápák RK is a Hungarian rugby club in Velence. They currently play in Hungarian National Championship I. For the 2011-12 season at least, they will be playing their matches in Székesfehérvár.

History
The club was founded in 2004.

Current squad

External links
  Velencei Kék Cápák RK

Hungarian rugby union teams
Rugby clubs established in 2004